Johanita Bénédicte Ndahimananjara (born June 5, 1960 in Maroantsetra) is a Malagasy politician.  She is a member of the Senate of Madagascar for Analanjirofo, and is a member of the AVI party. She was the Health Minister of Madagascar. She was also Minister of Environment.

References

1960 births
Living people
Government ministers of Madagascar
Members of the Senate (Madagascar)
Tiako I Madagasikara politicians
21st-century Malagasy women politicians
21st-century Malagasy politicians
People from Analanjirofo
Women government ministers of Madagascar